Adam Williams was an American Negro league second baseman in the 1920s.

Williams played for the Indianapolis ABCs in 1924. In eight recorded games, he posted five hits in 25 plate appearances.

References

External links
 and Seamheads

Year of birth missing
Year of death missing
Place of birth missing
Place of death missing
Indianapolis ABCs players
Baseball second basemen